Abidzi is a village in western Benin. It is located in Bantè commune in the former Zou Province of which since 1999 is part of the Collines Department.

Nearby towns and villages include Amou (6.3 nm), Kafingbe (2.0 nm), Miniki (3.6 nm), Sako (3.6 nm), Galata (4.0 nm), Soedji (5.4 nm) and Agome (4.5 nm). 

Populated places in Benin